Hula-Hopp, Conny is a 1959 West German musical comedy film directed by Heinz Paul and starring Cornelia Froboess, Rudolf Vogel and Susi Nicoletti. It was shot at the Bavaria Studios in Munich. The film's sets were designed by the art directors Hans Ledersteger and Herbert Ploberger.

Cast
 Cornelia Froboess as Cornelia "Conny" Haller
 Rudolf Vogel as 	John Newman
 Susi Nicoletti as 	Diana Haller
 Ingrid Pan as Steffi Gutlieb
 Elfie Pertramer as 	Erna Gutlieb
 Angèle Durand as 	Lola 
 Rex Gildo as 	Billy Newman 
 Paul Bös as 	Tommy
 Elke Arendt as Lotte
 Hans Zander as 	Fritz
 Harald Juhnke as Dr. Robert Berning
 Will Brandes as Christian
 Ulla Torp as 	Frau am Kaufhausfahrstuhl 
 Frithjof Vierock as 	Kaufhauslehrling Fritz

References

Bibliography 
 Bock, Hans-Michael & Bergfelder, Tim. The Concise CineGraph. Encyclopedia of German Cinema. Berghahn Books, 2009.

External links 
 

1959 films
1959 musical comedy films
German musical comedy films
West German films
1950s German-language films
Films directed by Heinz Paul
Films shot at Bavaria Studios
1950s German films